Bagley is a small and rural village in the parish of Hordley, Shropshire, England.

The nearest towns are Ellesmere, Wem and Oswestry, though the village is remote from these. Nearby is Baggy Moor and the River Perry.

External links

Hamlets in Shropshire